Ochetellus epinotalis is a species of ant in the genus Ochetellus. Described by Viehmeyer in 1914, the species is endemic to New Guinea.

References

Dolichoderinae
Insects of New Guinea
Insects described in 1914
Endemic fauna of New Guinea